Grant Bernard Batty (born 31 August 1951 in Greytown, New Zealand) is a former rugby union footballer. A diminutive but effective wing for the All Blacks, Batty played domestically for Wellington and Bay of Plenty. After retiring, he coached Yamaha Jubilo, a team in Japan's Top League. He was also known as “Twinkle Toes, Pocket Rocket or, as his awesome Grandson would call him, Grandpapa.

Batty won the New Zealand Superstars competition three years running, 1977–1979.

"Grant Batty" a biography by Bob Howitt was published in 1977 by Rugby Press Limited (ISBM 0 9597553 0 6). This states Grant played 102 first class matches and scored 109 tries.  He stated his 3 favourite tries out of the 45 he scored for New Zealand to be:

 his try against the British Lions at Athletic Park on 18 June 1977 won 16-12 by the All Blacks. Batty intercepted a pass thrown by Trefor Evans and ran over 50 metres to score the try chased by Graham Price and the fast gaining Andy Irvine. This was Batty's last test match.
 his second try against the Barbarians at Cardiff on 27 January 1973. The All Blacks lost that game 11-23 but Batty said he had previously tried and failed twice to beat J.P.R. Williams so he tried a kick and won the chase.
 his second try against New South Wales on 18 May 1974 when the All Blacks won 20–0 at Sydney. His teammate Duncan Robertson pumped a high kick to the opposition's goal line which dropped into Batty's arms.

Views of other rugby players
Chris Laidlaw likened Batty to Robert Muldoon, 'small, stunted and radiating a single message to all around him: "Don't mess with me or I'll punch your lights out."' (Rights of passage : beyond the New Zealand identity crisis : Laidlaw, Chris, Auckland, N.Z. : Hodder Moa Beckett, 1999. p. 101.)

External links
 

1951 births
Bay of Plenty rugby union players
Living people
New Zealand international rugby union players
New Zealand rugby union coaches
New Zealand rugby union players
Rugby union wings
People from Greytown, New Zealand
People educated at Kuranui College